Christopher French (fl. c. 1650–c.1713) was an Irish theologian.

A member of the Tribes of Galway, French joined the Dominican Order while in Galway and travelled to Louvain to complete his studies.

He was professor of divinity at the Dominican Convent at Rome, and was to hold a similar post for nine years at Osimo in Ancona, at the request of Cardinal Pallavicini. He afterwards returned to Louvain where he was Regent of the Irish Schools.

References

 Thesis Theologicae, Louvain, 1703
 Sir J. Kirwan (and others), Appellants, C.F. (Christopher French) Respondnet. The Respondent's Case, 1717
 History of Galway, James Hardiman, 1820
 Galway Authors, Helen Mahar, 1976

People from County Galway
17th-century Irish Roman Catholic theologians
Irish Dominicans
Year of birth uncertain
18th-century Irish Roman Catholic theologians